Anisoptera grossivenia is a tree in the family Dipterocarpaceae, native to Borneo. The specific epithet grossivenia means "veined like unripe fig", referring to the purple veins of the leaf.

Description
It has buttresses. The bark is fissured and flaky.

Distribution and habitat
Anisoptera grossivenia is endemic to Borneo. Its habitat is in lowland dipterocarp forests.

References

grossivenia
Endemic flora of Borneo
Taxonomy articles created by Polbot
Flora of the Borneo lowland rain forests